Rainbow is a compilation albums of covers recorded by Neil Diamond from 1969 to 1971. These songs were composed by some of the best-known singer-songwriters of the time.

The cover for Rainbow was originally an illustration by Craig Nelson, but was later replaced with photography by Tom Bert. This same photograph would later be re-used for the cover of Play Me: The Complete Uni Studio Recordings...Plus!

Track listing

References

Neil Diamond albums
Albums produced by Tom Catalano
Covers albums
1973 albums
MCA Records compilation albums